Abū Ibrāīm Ismā'īl ibn Yahyā Ibn Ismā'īl Ibn 'Amr Ibn Muslim Al-Muzanī Al-Misrī (791/2 – 878) was an Islamic jurist and theologian and one of leading member of Shafi'i school. A native of Cairo, he was a close disciple and companion of Imam Shafi'i. He has been called Al-Imam, al-'Allamah, Faqih al-Millah, and 'Alam az-Zahad. He was skilled in the legal verdicts and became one of the inheritors of Imam Shafi’i. Imam Shafi’i said about him: " al-Muzani is the standard-bearer of my school". He lived an ascetic life and died at the age of 89 on the 24th of Ramadan 264/30 May 878 and was buried near Imam al-Shafi'i.

Works
He wrote several works, his most famous one being his abridgement of Imam Shafi’i's al-Umm entitled Mukhtasar al-Muzani. An abridgement has been done to this work a 150 years later by the great jurist known as Imam al-Haramayn al-Juwayni who authored a celebrated work entitled Nihayat al-Matlab fi Dirayat al-Madhhab and is considered the only known abridgement of Mukhtasar al-Muzani. He wrote several other works such as Sharh al-Sunnah, al-Jami’ al-Kabir, al-Saghir, al-Manthur, al-Targhib fi al-‘Ilm, al-Masa’il al-Mu’tabarah, and al-Watha’iq. 

He was known to have debated many scholars on a variety of issues, mostly with the Hanafi scholars. He is also the uncle of Abu Ja'far al-Tahawi, an important scholar and Imam of the Hanafi school.

References 

Shafi'is
790s births
877 deaths
9th-century jurists